Mykhaylo Serhiyovych Rudavskyi (born 26 May 2001) is a Ukrainian professional footballer who plays as a left-back for Metalist 1925 Kharkiv.

Career

Early years
Born in Kharkiv, Rudavskyi began his career in the local KhTZ and Metalist Kharkiv and then continued in the Shakhtar Donetsk academy. His first coaches were Serhiy Sokhan and Roman Melnyk. He played in the Ukrainian Premier League Reserves and never made his debut for the senior Shakhtar Donetsk squad.

Vovchansk
In July 2021 Rudavskyi signed a year contract with the Ukrainian Second League side Vovchansk and made the debut as a starting player in a losing home match against Trostianets on 31 July 2021.

Metalist 1925 Kharkiv
In August 2022 he signed a 3-year deal with the Ukrainian Premier League side Metalist 1925 Kharkiv and made his debut in the Ukrainian Premier League in an away match against Shakhtar Donetsk on 23 August 2022.

References

External links
 
 

2001 births
Living people
Footballers from Kharkiv
Kharkiv State College of Physical Culture 1 alumni
Ukrainian footballers
Ukraine youth international footballers
Association football defenders
FC Shakhtar Donetsk players
FC Vovchansk players
FC Metalist 1925 Kharkiv players
Ukrainian Premier League players
Ukrainian Second League players